Terry and the Pirates (1940) is the 10th film serial released by Columbia. It is based on the comic strip Terry and the Pirates created by Milton Caniff. In his biography, Meanwhile..., Caniff stated that he hated the serial for changing so much of his comic strip, and that "I saw the first chapter and walked out screaming".

Plot
Young explorer Terry Lee and his grown-up sidekick, Pat Ryan, arrive in the Asian jungles in search of Terry's father, Dr. Herbert Lee. The elder Lee is an archaeologist, and the leader of a scientific expedition seeking evidence of a lost civilization. Soon, Terry discovers that his father has been kidnapped by an armed pirate gang known as the Leopard Men. The gang is led by the evil Master Fang, a local warlord who controls half of the natives and holds the white settlers in fear. Fang is seeking the riches hidden beneath the Sacred Temple of Mara. Terry meets the Dragon Lady, who is determined that her kingdom shall not be invaded. Attacked by Fang, his henchman Stanton, and the Leopard Men, Terry and Pat try valiantly to locate the missing Dr. Lee, uncover the secrets of the lost civilization, and recover the hidden treasure of Mara. After joining forces with Connie, Normandie, and the Dragon Lady, the heroes have myriad varied adventures in the inhospitable environment.

Cast
 William Tracy as Terry Lee
 Jeff York as Pat Ryan (as Granville Owen)
 Joyce Bryant as Normandie Drake
 Allen Jung as Connie-aka George Webster Confucious
 Victor DeCamp as Big Stoop (as Victor De Camp)
 Sheila Darcy as The Dragon Lady
 Dick Curtis as Master Fang
 John Paul Jones as Dr. Herbert Lee (as J. Paul Jones)
 Forrest Taylor as Allen Drake
 Jack Ingram as Stanton

Chapter titles
 Into the Great Unknown
 The Fang Strikes
 The Mountain of Death
 The Dragon Queen Threatens
 At the Mercy of the Mob
 The Scroll of Wealth
 Angry Waters
 The Tomb of Peril
 Jungle Hurricane
 Too Many Enemies
 Walls of Doom
 No Escape
 The Fatal Mistake
 Pyre of Death
 The Secret of the Temple

See also
 List of American films of 1940
 List of film serials by year
 List of film serials by studio

References

External links
 
 
 Terry and the Pirates at Cinefania.com

1940 films
1940s fantasy adventure films
American black-and-white films
Columbia Pictures film serials
1940s English-language films
Films directed by James W. Horne
Films based on American comics
Terry and the Pirates
American fantasy adventure films
1940s American films